The following lists events that happened during 1832 in Chile.

Incumbents
President of Chile: José Joaquín Prieto

Events

January
14 January - Battle of Epulafquen

Births
date unknown - Pedro Lagos (d. 1884)
21 February - Maximiano Errázuriz (d. 1890)

Deaths
19 April - Melchor José Ramos (b. 1805)

References 

1830s in Chile
Chile
Chile